Curtis Brown (born 1956) is a former NASA astronaut.

Curtis Brown may also refer to:

Curtis Brown (outfielder) (born 1945), American left fielder for the Montreal Expos
Curtis Brown (first baseman) (1923–1999), American first baseman for the New York Black Yankees
Curt Brown (baseball) (born 1960), American former Major League pitcher for California and Montreal
Curtis Brown (cornerback) (born 1988), American football cornerback
Curtis Brown (running back, born 1954) (1954–2015), American former running back for the Buffalo Bills
Curtis Brown (running back, born 1984), American former Brigham Young running back
Curtis Brown (ice hockey) (born 1976), Canadian ice hockey player
Curtis Brown (agency), firm of literary agents based in London, UK
Curtis Don Brown (born 1958), American serial killer